Ottawa—Vanier (formerly known as Ottawa East) is a provincial electoral district in Ottawa, Ontario, Canada, that has been represented in the Legislative Assembly of Ontario since 1908. It is located in the east end of Ottawa.

The riding, with a large Franco-Ontarian population in Vanier, Overbrook, Lower Town, and in adjoining neighbourhoods, has been one of the most solidly Liberal in the country in recent years, having elected Liberals both federally and provincially in every election since 1971.

A sizable minority of the riding is in the former city of Vanier, which was merged with Ottawa in 2000.  Vanier has long been home to much of Ottawa's francophone population, but between 1992 and 2001, the size of this linguistic group has fallen by almost 50%.  Since 2003, the population of the entire riding has fallen by almost 10% at a time when the rest of the nation's capital increased by approximately 5.2%.  The riding now has the second oldest population in Ottawa.

In many ways the riding which used to be known as a French riding with an English face has become a largely English-speaking riding (65%) with a French face.  The riding also contains the wealthiest part of Ottawa, Rockcliffe Park, which gives some support to the Progressive Conservatives, but also to the Liberals.  The neighbourhoods with higher proportions of anglophone residents, including Sandy Hill and New Edinburgh also tend to vote Liberal, but with significant support for the Ontario New Democratic Party.  The riding is characterized by below average voter turn-out and an annual loss of approximately 1% in voter support for the provincial Liberals since 1987 thereby reducing their support from approximately 74% to 50% (1987–2007).

Geography
In 2003, it was redefined as the part of the City of Ottawa east and north of a line running south along the Rideau Canal from the interprovincial boundary to Mann Avenue, northeast to Nicholas Street, southeast to Highway No. 417, and east to the abandoned Canadian Pacific Railway to the hydroelectric transmission line, north to Innes Road, northeast to Blair Road, northwest to Montreal Road, east and northeast to Regional Road No. 174, northeast to Green's Creek, north to the Ottawa River. It contains the neighbourhoods of Beacon Hill North, Cardinal Glen, Carson Grove, Carson Meadows, Castle Heights, Cyrville, Forbes, Lindenlea, Lower Town, Manor Park, New Edinburgh, Overbook, Pineview, Rockcliffe Park, Sandy Hill, Rothwell Heights, Vanier and Viscount Alexander Park.

Demographics
According to the Canada 2011 Census
 Ethnic Groups: 71.9% White, 9.5% Black, 3.5% Arab, 3.1% South Asian, 2.8% Aboriginal, 2.3% Chinese, 1.7% Latin American, 1.4% Filipino, 1.3% Southeast Asian, 1.1% West Asian
 Languages: 51.8% English, 30.6% French, 3.5% Arabic, 1.8% Spanish, 1.5% Chinese, 1.1% Creoles
 Religion: 65.9% Christian (44.6% Catholic, 4.7% Anglican, 3.3% United Church, 1.5% Christian Orthodox, 1.1% Baptist, 9.7% Other Christian), 7.6% Muslim, 22.8% No religion. 
 Average household income: $77,347
 Median household income: $57,035
 Average individual income: $45,200
 Median individual income: $32,421

History

The provincial electoral district was created in 1908 as "Ottawa East". The name was changed to "Ottawa—Vanier" in 1999.

One MLA, elected through First past the post, represented the district.

Members of the Legislative Assembly/Members of Provincial Parliament
This district elected the following members of the Legislative Assembly of Ontario, :

1 In 1938, the title of members of the Legislative Assembly of Ontario was changed from "Members of the Legislative Assembly" (MLAs) to "Members of Provincial Parliament" (MPPs).

Election results

^ Change is from redistributed results.

1933-1966 Ottawa Ward, By Ward, Rideau Ward, St. George's Ward, Riverdale Ward (east of Main Street), Victoria Ward (east of Parkdale Avenue)

|-

1908-1933 Ottawa Ward, By Ward, Rideau Ward, St. George's Ward

2007 electoral reform referendum

References

(8½x11) (Detailed)
Ottawa-Vanier Greens
Ottawa-Vanier Liberals
Ottawa-Vanier NDP
Ottawa-Vanier Progressive Conservatives
Map of riding for 2018 election

Provincial electoral districts of Ottawa